Jetty Kleijn (short for Henriëtte Cornelia Margaretha Kleijn) is a Dutch computer scientist known for her work in automata theory and concurrent computing, on Petri nets, and on interactions between computer science and biology. A 2020 special issue of Fundamenta Informaticae was dedicated to Kleijn in celebration of her 65th birthday.

Education and employment
Kleijn received a PhD from Leiden University in 1983. Her advisor was Grzegorz Rozenberg. She is currently a Professor of Theoretical Computing Science at Leiden University.

References

Living people
Dutch computer scientists
Women computer scientists
Leiden University alumni
Academic staff of Leiden University
1955 births